Outsiders is the second and final studio album by the British punk rock band Gnarwolves, released on 5 May 2017.

Track listing

Personnel
Thom Weeks – vocals, guitar
Charlie Piper – vocals, bass
Max Weeks – drums

References

2017 albums
Big Scary Monsters Recording Company albums
Gnarwolves albums
Pure Noise Records albums